Allan Everett Sloane (June 14, 1914 – April 29, 2001) was an Emmy-winning writer for radio and television. His career was significantly affected by the Hollywood blacklist.

Early life

He was born to Benjamin and Rachel Wisansky Silverman in New York City and grew up in New Jersey.  After completing college in 1936, he became a newspaper journalist, writing for the Cape Cod Colonial, Parade, and the Philadelphia Bulletin.

Prior to serving in the U.S.Army during World War II, Sloane began writing scripts for radio, including service-action shows like "The Man Behind the Gun" (for which he dramatized the Allied landing on Sicily the day after the invasion, winning a 1943 Peabody Award), "Top Secret" and "Indictment".    Sloane also wrote scripts for United Nations Radio and the United Jewish Appeal after the war, focusing on displaced persons in Europe.

Blacklisted

In November 1952, he was blacklisted by CBS, which stopped all his radio script-work.  Sloane appeared as a voluntary "friendly witness" for the House Un-American Activities Committee on January 13, 1954.  For several decades thereafter, he used the pseudonym Ellison Carroll to avoid blacklist-related publicity.

His early radio work with actor Irving Pichel led to a job as researcher for the 1953 film Martin Luther, for which he shared a nomination for the 1954 Writers' Guild Best American Drama with Lothar Wolff.

Television Writer

He began writing episodes for television series in 1954-55, among them Crossroads, and Navy Log.  He is credited with creating the 1966 series Hawk, which featured Burt Reynolds as the title character, as well as guest appearances by Gene Hackman, Robert Duvall, and Diane Baker.

During the 1960s, he was well-enough considered to be asked to write the TV adaptation of Johnny Belinda, as well as scripts for TV theatre.   Much of Sloane's later writing was longer-form shows (1+ hours) dealing with the situations of special individuals, including autism (And James Was A Very Small Snail), Downs' syndrome (This Is My Son, and Emily, Emily), displaced persons (Eleven Memory Street), gifted children (Sit Down and Shut Up, or Get Out), and sickle-cell anemia (To All My Friends On Shore).

Recognition

Under his pseudonym Ellison Carroll, he was nominated for an Emmy for his 1963 Breaking Point screenplay And James Was A Very Small Snail; and again in 1969 for the Hallmark Hall of Fame (episode 81) Teacher, Teacher.  In 1972, he won the Emmy for Outstanding Writing Achievement in Drama (Original Teleplay) with To All My Friends On Shore.

His papers are held in the Hargrett Library at the University of Georgia.  Recordings of a number of his radio shows, and some lectures are maintained in the Walter J. Brown Media Archives and Peabody Collection, also at the University of Georgia.

Personal life

Post-war, Sloane lived on Long Island, and commuted to New York (although he shared a small apartment in Manhattan with fellow-writer Alvin Boretz).  He soon moved his family to New Canaan, Connecticut, where he lived for much of his professional life.  He and his wife Elouise had three sons (one of whom was autistic).

References

1914 births
2001 deaths
Primetime Emmy Award winners
American radio writers
American television writers
United States Army personnel of World War II
20th-century American screenwriters